Lyudmila Aleksandrovna Ocheretnaya (() and formerly Putina; born 6 January 1958) is the former wife of Vladimir Putin, the current president and former prime minister of Russia.

Early life and education 
Lyudmila was born in Kaliningrad, Soviet Union, the daughter of Alexander (his patronym is reported variously as either Abramovich<ref>"Особая папка" Владимира Путина: итоги первого президентского срока и отношения с крупными собственниками', 'Алексей Мухин
Центр политической информации, 2004, p.22</ref>Взлет и падение государства российского, Борис Николаевич Красильников, (Макс-Принт, 2003), p.572 or Avramovich) Shkrebnev (Александр Абрамович Шкребнев or Александр Аврамович Шкребнев) and Yekaterina Tikhonovna Shkrebneva (Екатерина Тихоновна Шкребнева). Her father worked at Kaliningrad Mechanical Plant. 

She was educated as a linguist. In 1986, Lyudmila graduated from the branch of Spanish language and philology of the Department of Philology of Leningrad State University.

  Later life and marriage 

In her early adult years, Lyudmila was a flight attendant for the Kaliningrad branch of Aeroflot. She met Vladimir Putin at a Arkady Raikin concert in Leningrad, and they married on 28 July 1983. The couple have two daughters, Maria (born on 28 April 1985 in Leningrad, Soviet Union) and Katerina (born on 31 August 1986 in Dresden, East Germany).

From 1990 to 1994, Lyudmila taught German at the Department of Philology of Leningrad State University. For a few years prior to Vladimir's appointment as Prime Minister of Russia in August 1999, she was a Moscow representative of the company Telecominvest from 1998 to 1999 where she, as the only employee in the Moscow office, answered phone calls and organized meetings.

In early 1997 and previously, she, her husband, their family, and the family of Nikolai Shamalov enjoyed vacations in Davos, Switzerland.

During July 1998, she, her husband, and their family vacationed in the south of France where her husband attended important meetings before he became head of FSB after which the Putin family cancelled their planned August vacation in Davos.

 First Lady 

After Vladimir's rise to political power, Lyudmila maintained a low profile on the Russian political stage, generally avoiding the limelight except as required by protocol and restricting her public role to supportive statements about her husband."A look at the Putins over the years", The Moscow Times, 6 June 2013.

 Role in spelling controversy 
As First Lady, Lyudmila Putina was a curator of a fund that aimed to develop the Russian language and sometimes produced statements concerning Russian language and education. Her preference for "maintaining and preserving" the Russian language led her to make public statements against orthographic reform. The Russian Academy of Science sponsored a commission to study the orthography of the Russian language and propose changes. Their recommendations were made public in 2002 after eight years of work, but were subsequently rejected by Putina, who used Russia's burgeoning economy as one of her reasons why the orthographic reform was not just unnecessary but untimely. However, although one newspaper in Moscow alleged that "Lyudmila Putina de facto cancelled any attempts to reform spelling," the fact remains that public and academic reaction to the reforms was sufficiently negative to have that particular reform attempt abandoned.

 Divorce and remarriage 
On 6 June 2013, she and Putin publicly announced the termination of their marriage based on a mutual decision. The divorce announcement was made on camera for the Russian news media at the State Kremlin Palace during the intermission of a performance by the Kremlin Ballet, ending years of speculation about their relationship. In April 2014, the Kremlin confirmed that their divorce had been finalized.

In January 2016, Lyudmila was reported to have married Artur Ocheretny (born 29 March 1978) in early 2015.

 Property and business 
According to Reuters, Lyudmila helped create and supports the foundation called the Centre for the Development of Inter-personal Communications (CDIC) which generates millions of dollars. The CDIC's offices are located in the center of Moscow, on Vozdvizhenka Street in the building previously known as Volkonsky House, which is its own property. The building, which once belonged to Leo Tolstoy's grandfather, was listed in Russian cultural heritage register but was completely rebuilt in 2013, raising its height from two stories to four, despite numerous objections and protests by Moscow citizens including an unanswered appeal to Vladimir Putin signed by 200 famous science and cultural persons of the city.

The building is mainly occupied by commercial tenants, including VTB Bank, Sberbank, a construction company called Severstroygroup, a sushi restaurant, and a Burger King. Total rent from the building is about $3–4 million.

Tenants pay their rent to a company known as Meridian, which is in turn owned by a company known as Intererservis, which is wholly owned by Lyudmila. Her sister, Olga Alexandrovna Tsomayeva, was previously General Director of Intererservis. Artur Ocheretny, Lyudmila's second husband, chairs the CDIC's management board.

Sanctions
Following the 2022 Russian invasion of Ukraine, Lyudmila was sanctioned by the United Kingdom on 13 May 2022. The Foreign, Commonwealth and Development Office stated that Lyudmila has "benefited from preferential business relationships with state-owned entities".

Honours and medals
National

 Laureate of the "Persons of the Year 2002" contest by Komsomolskaya Pravda'' in the category of "Educator of the Year" (2002)
 Honorary Citizen of Kaliningrad (2007)

Foreign

 Germany: Laureate of the Jacob Grimm Prize (2002)
 Kyrgyzstan: Laureate of the "Rukhaniyat" prize of the International Association for the Rebirth of Spirituality (2002)
 Kazakhstan:
 Honorary Professor of the Eurasian National University named after Gumilev (2005)
 Golden Warrior medal (2005)

Notes

References

External links 

Official biography 

|-

1958 births
Living people
First Ladies of Russia
Russian women in business
People from Kaliningrad
Saint Petersburg State University alumni
Family of Vladimir Putin